Nicolae Beldiceanu (26 October 1844 in Preutești - 2 February 1896 in Iași) was a Romanian poet and novelist. Beldiceanu was the first person to write about the discoveries made at the Cucuteni archaeological site near the town of Cucuteni, Romania. He had helped four other scholars from Iași with the excavation of this site in 1885, and published an article entitled: Antichitățile de la Cucuteni (Antiquities of Cucuteni) the same year. This site was the first discovery of what would later become known as the Cucuteni-Trypillian culture.

His son Nicolae N. Beldiceanu was also a noted poet and writer.

Selected published works
 Tala. Nuvelă contimporană, Iași, 1882
 Antichitățile de la Cucuteni article in the journal: Schiţă arheologică, 1885
 Elemente de istoria românilor, I-III, Iaşi, 1893-1894
 Poezii, Iași, 1893
 Doine, Iași, 1893
 Poezii, Bucharest, 1914

See also
 Partial Bibliography of Nicolae Beldiceanu's works and literary contributions.

References

Bibliography
 Dicționarul literaturii române de la origini până la 1900, Bucharest, 1979
 Dicționarul scriitorilor români, coordonat de Mircea Zaciu, Marian Papahagi, Aurel Sasu, A-C, Bucharest, 1995

1844 births
1896 deaths
People from Suceava County
Romanian poets
Romanian male poets
Burials at Eternitatea cemetery
19th-century poets
19th-century male writers